The Oravița is a left tributary of the river Lișava in Romania. It flows into the Lișava in Greoni.

References

Rivers of Romania
Rivers of Caraș-Severin County